Saïdou Idrissa (born 24 December 1985), is a Nigerien professional footballer who last played as a striker for AS SONIDEP. He has represented the Niger national team at international level.

Club career
Idrissa was born in Niamey.

After a spell in Belgium with K.A.A. Gent, he signed for Cotonsport FC de Garoua in 2010.

International career
Idrissa played for Niger from 2003 to 2013.

References

External links

Profile on AFRIDEVPROFOOT

1985 births
Living people
People from Niamey
Association football forwards
Nigerien footballers
Étoile Filante de Ouagadougou players
K.A.A. Gent players
Rail Club du Kadiogo players
Coton Sport FC de Garoua players
Chippa United F.C. players
Sahel SC players
AS SONIDEP players
Nigerien expatriate footballers
Expatriate footballers in Belgium
Nigerien expatriate sportspeople in Belgium
Expatriate footballers in Burkina Faso
Nigerien expatriate sportspeople in Burkina Faso
Expatriate footballers in Cameroon
Nigerien expatriate sportspeople in Cameroon
Expatriate soccer players in South Africa
Nigerien expatriate sportspeople in South Africa
Niger international footballers
2012 Africa Cup of Nations players